FC Viktoriya Maryina Gorka is a Belarusian football club based in Marjina Horka, Minsk Oblast.

History
The team was founded in 1990 as FC Belarus Maryina Gorka and until 1991, they played in the lower levels of the Belarusian SSR league. In 1992, Belarus joined the newly created Belarusian First League. After the 1992–93 season, Belarus withdrew to amateur level due to lack of funds. They returned to the professional level in 1996, when they changed their name to Energiya-TEC-5 Maryina Gorka and joined the Belarusian Second League. The next year, Energiya-TEC-5 relocated to the neighbour village Druzhny, and after the end of the 1997 season, the team was disbanded.

The club was reformed to play in Minsk Oblast league as Zvezda Maryina Gorka from 2002 until 2005 and again since 2010. Between 2010 and 2012, the club was known as Zvezda Pukhovichi, and during 2013–2014 as Zvezda-RFOC-Viktoriya Pukhovichi, representing the neighboring town of Pukhovichi, 6 km northeast from Maryina Gorka.

In 2015, the club rejoined the Belarusian Second League for the first time since 1997 as Viktoriya Maryina Gorka.

Current squad
As of November 2022

References 

Association football clubs established in 1990
Association football clubs disestablished in 1997
1990 establishments in Belarus
1997 disestablishments in Belarus
FC Viktoryja Marjina Horka
Football clubs in Belarus